Saab-Scania AB was a Swedish vehicle manufacturer that was formed from the 1969 merger of Saab AB and Scania-Vabis. The company was split in 1995.

History
Truck and bus manufacturer Scania AB of Södertälje merged with car and aeroplane manufacturer Saab AB of Trollhättan on 1 September 1969, under the Wallenberg family group of companies. The merger meant that Saab no longer had to import the British Triumph Slant-4 engine, and could instead use the engine production facilities of Scania. In 1972 they started manufacturing the 2.0 L B version. In 1977, Saab took advantage of Scania's experience with turbochargers and added one to the engine, thus creating one of the earliest turbocharged automobile engines to be produced in large numbers.

When the corporation was split in 1995, the name of the truck and bus division changed back to Scania AB. Saab Aircraft (Saab AB) and Saab cars were also split, with General Motors buying a major holding in Saab Automobile AB.

Divisions
Saab-Scania consisted of following divisions:

Aircraft (traded under the Saab AB brand) – until 1995
Cars (traded under the Saab Automobile brand) – until 1990
Trucks & Buses (traded under the Scania brand) – until 1995

Subsidiaries
Saab-Scania had following subsidiaries:

AB Svenska Järnvägsverkstädernas Aeroplanavdelning (ASJA) – until 1981
Jönköping – until 1983
Nordarmatur – until 1983
Parca Norrahammar – until 1983
MJ – until 1984
Enertech – to 1988
Combitech – from 1982 to 1995
Saab-Valmet – from 1968 to 1992

See also

 Marcus Wallenberg-hallen – Scania Museum in Södertälje, Sweden
 Swedish Air Force Museum – aircraft museum in Linköping, Sweden

References

Further reading

External links
Saab Aerotech website
Saab Automobile website
The Saab Car Museum
Scania corporate site
Scania Museum at Södertälje
Saab Group website
Saab Seaeye

Bus manufacturers of Sweden
Truck manufacturers of Sweden
Defunct motor vehicle manufacturers of Sweden
Saab
Aircraft manufacturers of Sweden
Scania AB
Companies related to the Wallenberg family
Robotics companies
Robotics in Sweden
Companies formerly listed on Nasdaq Stockholm
Vehicle manufacturing companies established in 1969
Vehicle manufacturing companies disestablished in 1995
1969 establishments in Sweden
Car manufacturers of Sweden
Swedish companies disestablished in 1995
Swedish companies established in 1969